Douela or Douala is a village and locality in Tunisia, situated on the Mediterranean coast at latitude 36.8167°, longitude 10.5667° (37km east of Tunis) and near Sīdī `Ammār, Korbous, and El Bredj.

Locality
Douela lies on the Cap Bon peninsula surrounded by the Qorbus Forest, the area especially the thermal springs at nearby Korbous have been popular as a health resort since Roman times.

History
During the Roman Empire and late antiquity the village of Douela was a town of the Roman province of Africa Proconsularis. The site has revealed numerous inscription in the ruins of the Roman town which tell us the Ancient town was a civitas known as Mizigitanorum. 

In antiquity, Douela was also the seat of a Christian bishopric known as Mizigi. This diocese remains today a titular bishopric of the Roman Catholic Church.  Only two bishops of ancient Douela (Mizigi) are known. 
 The name of Adeodatus was discovered in the inscription on the dedication of a church, possibly the bishop who had it built. 
Placido attended the Council of Carthage (525)
Raúl Antonio Martinez Paredes of Guatemala is the current bishop.

The town also has a mosque.

References

Roman towns and cities in Tunisia
Archaeological sites in Tunisia
Ancient Berber cities
Populated places in Tunisia
Catholic titular sees in Africa